"White Boy Summer" is a hip-hop song about "women, strip clubs, money and online adult entertainment" by Chet Hanx released in 2021. Prior to the release of the song, Hanx posted several Instagram videos declaring that summer 2021 would be a "white boy summer," and offered some advice to white men on fashion and behavior. The title is a reference to Megan Thee Stallion's "Hot Girl Summer" song.

Music video

The video shows him with scantily clad women, marijuana, and a Jamaican flag.

Controversies

It has been criticized for cultural appropriation. The song and its video have been the subject of online discourse, such as the song title's supposed connotations of white pride and white privilege. 

Some extremist users also used "White Boy Summer" as their reaction to oppose anti-racist events, such as the Black Lives Matter protests. They used the term to refer to a utopia or war against their enemies. Among them was the white nationalist commentator Nick Fuentes, who used it as a slogan to disrupt an event hosted by the Conservative Political Action Conference with his followers.

References 

Songs about sexuality
2021 singles
2021 songs
Race-related controversies in music